Heeb is a Germanic surname that may refer to
Adolf Heeb (born 1940), Liechtenstein cyclist and politician 
Armando Heeb (born  1990), Liechtensteiner football player
Barbara Heeb (born 1969), Swiss road racing cyclist
Birgit Heeb-Batliner (born 1972), Liechtenstein alpine skier 
Martin Heeb (born  1969), Liechtenstein football player